is a 1986 low-budget science fiction/horror film with Body horror elements, written and directed by Japanese poet/folk singer Shigeru Izumiya.

The experimental film is credited as being the first core of the Japanese cyberpunk subgenre that emerged during the 1980s, predating both Katsuhiro Otomo's anime film adaptation of Akira and Shinya Tsukamoto's Tetsuo: The Iron Man.

Izumiya also stars in his own film, as one of the three scientists who have stolen a cybernetic android and take it to an abandoned warehouse.

Plot 
In the very near future, a group of three conspirators capture a very special android named Guernica. The scientists bring her to a deserted warehouse, and tie her to a cot, with a protective covering over her mouth. One assisting researcher (Harima) is left to guard the Guernica, but the android secretes a reality-altering substance, causing Harima  to slowly lose his mind. The lead researcher and his female colleague (Norris) apparently have just escaped and are on their way back to the warehouse. Norris tries calling Harima and discovers that something must be wrong. They proceed carefully into the warehouse where they discover that Harima has gone crazy and now wants to kill them. Harima makes it to Guernica, who suddenly sits up and blows dust all over him.
After this point the movie turns extremely surreal. Guernica's body slowly disappears into dust, fighting and shooting are laced with hallucinations and end in a final act of violence.

Even though dialogue plays a rather minor role in the film, only about quarter of it is actually translated in English.

The script of Death Powder is available online.

Cast

Only the main characters:
Takichi Inukai as unnamed male researcher
Rikako Murakami as Norris
Shigeru Izumiya as Harima (third researcher)
Mari Natsuki as android Guernica

Cyberpunk with Body Horror
Death Power is also the earliest work which combined cyberpunk with body horror. Japanese films of this subgenre counter fears and anxieties of technological advancements by re-imagining the rise of technology as well as its effects on the individual and the society. To contradict apocalyptic fears of advancing technology, films  which combine these elements offer a vision of a “New Flesh.” A thesis from the University of Arkansas explored five films of the sub-genre - referring to them as examples of "New Flesh Cinema". Death Powder is the oldest of the five films, followed by Akira and Tetsuo: The Iron Man, which are both from 1988. The two other films, used as models for the sub-genre are 964 Pinocchio (1991) and Rubber's Lover (1996) both directed by Shozin Fukui. In all of these films technology serves as a mediator of our actions, interactions, and perception of reality Besides that they all stress the importance and discomfort of adapting and transforming, and finally address technophobia by revealing a fascination and fear of technology as well as the necessity to change towards a new and different world.

Reviews
Over the years I have seen my fair share of weird films and avant-garde cinema.
However, I can honestly say that Death Powder is quite possibly one the weirdest, if not the weirdest film I’ve ever seen.

Some of the most enjoyable parts of the film are of course its visuals.
Don't try to make any sense of any of it, just enjoy the images and let the smooth saxophone music take you away.

Fans of Japanese cyberpunk might indeed find this an interesting watch. Even if like me, you cannot make head or tale of it, you can still appreciate the influence it clearly has had on the genre. Equally fans of avant-garde and the truly bizarre might get a kick out of this.

Shortened version of the review by Niina Doherty first published on 11/19/2018: Horrornews.net 

I wonder if I’ve become jaded since watching a number of these extreme Japanese Cyberpunk flicks. Many comments about Death Powder indicate that people were blown away by the visuals and have never seen anything like this – some to the point of even having nightmares about it. If this is your first, or perhaps even second experience in delving into extreme Japanese Cyberpunk movies, than perhaps Death Powder comes off much better. However, as much as I love the experimental visuals, this movie clearly could have been put together better. There is a lack of crafting in Death Powder which negatively impacts the movie-watching experience. Still, Death Powder, while incoherent, is at least unique, creative and interesting, so there's certainly something worth watching here. It's for this reason that I'm giving it 5 stars out of ten. I really wish I was able to get a better transfer of this, but even if I had it, I still doubt I'd be giving it more than 5 stars.

Résumé of the review first published on June 9, 2006: CyberpunkRewiev.com

References

1986 films
Japanese science fiction horror films
Cyberpunk films
1980s science fiction horror films
1986 horror films
Robot films
Body horror anime and manga
1980s Japanese films